The Vie is an  long river in the department of Vendée, western France. Its source is near the town Belleville-sur-Vie. It flows generally west. It discharges into the Atlantic Ocean in Saint-Gilles-Croix-de-Vie.

Communes along its course
The following list is ordered from source to mouth: 
 Vendée: Bellevigny, Le Poiré-sur-Vie, Aizenay, La Chapelle-Palluau, Maché, Apremont, Coëx, Saint-Maixent-sur-Vie, Commequiers, Le Fenouiller, Notre-Dame-de-Riez, Saint-Hilaire-de-Riez, Saint-Gilles-Croix-de-Vie

References

0Vie
Rivers of France
Rivers of Pays de la Loire
Rivers of Vendée